The Goudreau Museum of Mathematics in Art and Science was a museum of math that was open from 1980–2006 in Long Island, New York. The museum was named after mathematics teacher Bernhard Goudreau, who died in 1985, and featured many of the 3-dimensional solid models, oversized wooden math games, and puzzles built by Goudreau and his former students. After the museum closed, Glen Whitney, a former math professor, decided to open the Museum of Mathematics in Manhattan (New York City), which opened in December 2012.

References

Defunct museums in New York (state)
Museums established in 1980
Museums disestablished in 2006
Museums in Nassau County, New York
Mathematics museums